Charles Edward Brickley (November 24, 1891 – December 28, 1949) was an American football player and coach.  He served as the head football coach at the Johns Hopkins University in 1915, at Boston College  from 1916 to 1917, and at Fordham University in 1920 with Joseph DuMoe as co-coach, compiling a career college football record of 22–9.  Brickley also coached the New York Brickley Giants of the American Professional Football Association—now the National Football League—in 1921, tallying a mark of 0–2. He also competed at the 1912 Summer Olympics.

Early life and family
Brickley was born in Boston, Massachusetts and raised in Everett, Massachusetts. He stood 5'10" and weighed 181 pounds during his athletic career.

Athletic career
Brickley attended Harvard College, where he played football from 1911 go 1914 for the Crimson as a fullback and placekicker under head coach Percy Haughton.  He was named an All-American in 1913 and 1914. During the 1913 Harvard–Yale game, Brickley kicked all five of Harvard's field goals in the Crimson's 15–5 win over Yale. He set college football records for most field goals made by one player in a single season (13) and most career field goals (34).

Brickley also competed in the triple jump at 1912 Summer Olympics, finishing 9th. At the same Olympics he competed in the baseball event which was held as demonstration sport.

In 1917, Brickley became a player-coach for the Massillon Tigers, of the Ohio League.

Coaching career
Brickley's first coaching job was during his senior year at Harvard, where he served as an assistant to the University of Virginia football team during the team's August practices.

After graduating, Brickley was sought by many schools looking for head coaches, including New York University and Penn State. After initially refusing to coach, Brickley eventually accepted the head coaching job at Johns Hopkins University.

In 1916, he led Boston College to its first victory over rival Holy Cross since 1889.  He left Boston College in 1918 to join the United States Navy Reserve. Brickley returned to coaching in 1921 as the backfield coach of the Fordham Rams, coaching his youngest brother Arthur. Brickley coached the New York Brickley Giants (Also known as Brickley's Giants or Brickley's Brooklyn Giants) of the National Football League in 1921. In 1922, Brickley was offered the position of head coach at Northwestern, but the two sides could not agree on terms and the school hired Glenn Thistlethwaite instead.

Later life
Brickley did not coach football after the 1921 season.  He worked as a stockbroker, shipbuilder, and advertising salesman until his death in 1949 in New York City. He settled in Bronxville, New York, where his two sons attended high school.

Legal trouble
In 1923, Brickley was indicted on charges of illegal stock negotiations. He was found not guilty of forgery and larceny by a jury on May 28, 1925. On March 1, 1928 Brickley was found guilty of four counts of larceny and bucketing orders from customers of Charles E. Brickley, Inc., stock brokerage firm, from 1925 to 1927. He was released on parole in December. In 1949, Brickley and his son, Charles, Jr. were arrested after starting a fight in a Manhattan restaurant. According to testimony, the fight began when Brickley overheard somebody say "Is that old bald-headed so-and-so Charlie Brickley, the football player?" 
or "You mean that old bald-headed man is the great Charlie Brickley?"  Brickley died the day the charges against him were to be dismissed.

Family
Brickley's brother George Brickley, played five games for the Philadelphia Athletics in 1913. His youngest brother Arthur Brickley played football and baseball for Columbia (1920), Fordham (1921), and Providence (1923).  Brickley's oldest son, Charles "Chick" Brickley, Jr. played football at Yale and was a minor league baseball player for the Boston Red Sox. His youngest son, John "Bud" Brickley,  signed with the New York Giants in 1946 following his discharge from the United States Marine Corps. His grandson, John Brickley, was a kicker for the University of Rhode Island.  His grandnephew is former National Hockey League player Andy Brickley.

Head coaching record

College

References

External links

1891 births
1949 deaths
American football drop kickers
American football fullbacks
American football placekickers
American stock traders
American stockbrokers
American male triple jumpers
Athletes (track and field) at the 1912 Summer Olympics
Baseball players at the 1912 Summer Olympics
Boston College Eagles football coaches
Fordham Rams football coaches
Harvard Crimson football players
Johns Hopkins Blue Jays football coaches
Massillon Tigers coaches
Massillon Tigers players
New York Brickley Giants
New York Brickley Giants players
Olympic track and field athletes of the United States
Olympic baseball players of the United States
All-American college football players
Players of American football from New York City
Sportspeople from Boston
Sportspeople from Everett, Massachusetts
Players of American football from Boston
Baseball players from Massachusetts
Harvard College alumni
Sportspeople convicted of crimes
United States Navy personnel of World War I
United States Navy reservists